Rev is an album by the American band Ultra Vivid Scene, released in 1992. It was the band's third and final album. The single, an edited "Blood and Thunder", reached number 27 on the Billboard Modern Rock Tracks chart. Ultra Vivid Scene supported the album by touring with Grant Lee Buffalo.

Production
The album was produced by Kurt Ralske and Fred Maher. Unlike previous albums, Ralske recorded Rev with many other musicians instead of just going it alone.

Ralske often wrote lyrics while still mostly asleep as he preferred the "naturalness" of the process. "Mirror to Mirror" is about materialism.

Critical reception

The Washington Post praised the "elegance" of the album. The Toronto Star wrote that Rev "has Nick Drake-like melodies, T. Rex-ish riffs, ethereal sliding guitar licks, restless rhythms, silences and explosions." The Chicago Tribune noted that Ralske "seems so juiced to be working with a live rhythm section that he just grooves on and on with little heed paid to pop structure."

Track listing
 "Candida" – 4:38
 "Cut-Throat" – 5:33
 "Mirror to Mirror" – 4:50
 "The Portion of Delight" – 6:12
 "Thief's Love Song" – 6:07
 "How Sweet" – 4:40
 "Medicating Angels" – 8:11
 "Blood and Thunder" – 10:21
 "This Is the Way" – 2:48

Singles
"Blood and Thunder" (February 8, 1993)
 "Blood and Thunder" (remix edit)
 "Don't Look Now (Now!)" (Crash cover)
 "Candida (Theme from 'Red Pressure Mounting')"
 "Winter Song" (Nico cover)

Personnel
Ron Baldwin – backing vocals
Everett Bradley – conga
Dorit Chrysler – backing vocals
Jack Daley – bass
Julius Klepacz – drums
Fred Maher – acoustic guitar, drums, producer
Lloyd Puckitt – engineer
Kurt Ralske – guitar, vocals, producer, engineer
Rasputina
Melora Creager – cello
Serena Jost – cello
Julia Kent – cello
Matthew Sweet – bass
Sarah Walker – backing vocals

References

Ultra Vivid Scene albums
1992 albums
4AD albums
albums produced by Fred Maher